The 2005 Yemeni League is the 13th edition of top level football in Yemen.

Final table

External links
 

Yemeni League seasons
Yem
1